Tomás Romero Pereira, commonly known as Maria Auxiliadora, is a town and district in the Itapúa Department of Paraguay.

Sources 
World Gazeteer: Paraguay – World-Gazetteer.com
Tomas Romero Pereira Municipality – Tomas Romero Pereira Municipality

Districts of Itapúa Department